The Women's 50 metre freestyle competition of the 2016 European Aquatics Championships was held on 21 and 22 May 2016.

Records
Prior to the competition, the existing world, European and championship records were as follows.

Results

Heats
The heats were held on 21 May at 09:35.

Semifinals
The semifinals were held on 21 May at 17:48.

Semifinal 1

Semifinal 2

Final
The final was held on 22 May at 16:02.

References

Women's 50 metre freestyle
2016 in women's swimming